Thomas Dew may refer to:

 Thomas Roderick Dew (1802–1846), American educator and writer
 Thomas Dew (politician) (died c. 1681), Virginia landowner and politician